Živorad Kovačević (Serbian Cyrillic Живорад Ковачевић; 30 May 1930 – 23 March 2011) was a Yugoslav and Serbian diplomat, politician, NGO activist, academic and writer.

Biography

Early life and education
Živorad Kovačević was born in Jagodina, Kingdom of Yugoslavia (present-day Serbia), of father Ilija, who spent World War II as a prisoner in Mauthausen, and mother Darinka. His older brother, Radovan, was killed by Germans in Jagodina in 1941; he is survived by an older sister, Stojanka. Živorad Kovačević was educated at an all-male Gymnasium called "Šesta Muška" in Belgrade, and then the Journalist Diplomatic Academy (Viša Novinarsko-Diplomatska Škola) graduating in 1952. He received his M.A. in political science from the University of California, Berkeley in 1961, and specialized in international relations at Harvard University in 1963.

Political career
Kovačević worked as the Editor-in-Chief of the magazine Komuna (1954–1962), Director of Public Administration Institute (1962–1964), Vice-Secretary of the Executive Council of Serbia (1964–1967), and Secretary General of the Standing Conference of Towns and Municipalities (1967–1973).

He served as Deputy Mayor and then Mayor of Belgrade for eight years, from 1974 to 1982. During his tenure, Sava Centar was built in time to host the Conference on Security and Co-operation in Europe, as well as the Hotel InterContinental for the meeting of the International Monetary Fund and the World Bank. Many other projects were carried out during this period, most notably, Ada Ciganlija and Klinički Centar Srbije (Serbian Clinical Center). Kovačević was quoted as being proud of the fact that each year during his term between 10,000 and 12,000 apartments were built in the capital. On a more symbolic level, as a mayor, he set up a monument to Karađorđe (the leader of the first Serbian uprising against the Turks) on the great lawn in front of the National Library of Serbia.

From 1982 to 1986, Kovačević was a Minister in the government of Milka Planinc, a Prime Minister of Yugoslavia who tried to undertake economic reform after years of stagnation. Working in the federal government, he was a member of the Federal Executive Council, as well as the President of the Foreign Affairs Commission, paving the way to a career that was more international in perspective.

Kovačević was appointed Ambassador of Yugoslavia to the United States in 1987, but was recalled in 1989 after his disapproval of Slobodan Milosević's policy, which he openly criticized in Washington. He was noted as one of a few citizens of Belgrade who met six American presidents, John F. Kennedy, Richard Nixon, Gerald Ford, Jimmy Carter, Ronald Reagan, and George Bush, and five Secretaries of State, Henry Kissinger, Cyrus Vance, George P. Shultz, James Baker, and Lawrence Eagleburger. His personal contribution, while ambassador in the US, in sending Nikola Tesla's assets from the United States to Belgrade is widely acknowledged.

NGO activities
After his recall from the post of the Ambassador to the United States in 1989, Kovačević retired from the Ministry of Foreign Affairs and spent the rest of his life as a prominent NGO activist and promoter of Serbia's integration in the European Union. He was the President of the Forum on International Relations, and in 1994, he joined the European Movement in Serbia, whose president he was to become in 1999. He held that position for the rest of his life.

Based on his personal account, Kovačević was offered the post of Foreign Minister in the Government of Milan Panić in 1992, but was prevented by Borisav Jović from taking it.

Kovačević was one of the founders of the Igman Initiative, which rallies 140 organizations in the so-called 'Dayton Triangle' (Serbia, Montenegro, Croatia, and Bosnia and Herzegovina). The Igman Initiative launched a "mini-Schengen" project, to bring about better relations on the territory of Former Yugoslavia similar to those that exist in the European Union, primarily in terms of a visa-free regime. The organization was founded following Kovačević's endeavors in April 1995, when, with a group of 38 anti-war intellectuals and activists from FR Yugoslavia, Kovačević crossed Mount Igman to join and support the citizens of Sarajevo during the siege.

Kovačević was the first President of the Foreign Relations Council of the Ministry of Foreign Affairs of the Republic of Serbia, established in 2007.

Academic activities
In parallel with his work in helping build democratic relations in Serbia and elsewhere, Kovačević was a prolific writer. Following his long-term passion for languages and the written word, he published the first dictionary of idioms (both English-Serbian and Serbian-English). To these, he added one of his most popular works, "Lažni prijatelji u engleskom jeziku: zamke doslovnog prevođenja" (False Friends in the English Language: Traps of Literal Translation), as well as a number of titles on international relations and negotiation. He taught international negotiations at the Diplomatic Academy and the Department of Political Sciences in Belgrade and Podgorica, often lecturing about U.S. foreign policy and the break-up of Yugoslavia. He delivered his last lecture a week before his death.

Awards
In 2000, Kovačević was awarded The Elise and Walter A. Haas International Award that "honors an alumnus of the University of California, Berkeley who is a native, citizen, and resident of a nation other than the United States of America, and who has a distinguished record of service to his or her country.

Personal life

Živorad Kovačević spent more than half a century married to Margita Kovačević, who died only three months before him. They shared a life as well as beliefs; she was with him every step of the way, among other things, taking part in demonstrations to protest the local election fraud during the reign of Slobodan Miošević.  "Rain or shine we went there every day for 88 days," Kovačević said. 

His daughter, Jelena Kovačević, an accomplished American engineer and scientist, is presently the William R. Berkley Professor and Dean of the NYU Tandon School of Engineering.

Death
Kovačević committed suicide on 23 March 2011 in his apartment in Vračar, Belgrade. He was interred in the Belgrade New Cemetery on 26 March 2011.

Published books

References

External links

 European Movement in Serbia (Serbian)
 European Movement in Serbia In Memoriam (Serbian)
 European Movement in Serbia (English)
 Igman Initiative (English)
 Haas Award
 Speech 'From Helsinki to Belgrade'
 Interview 'Nisam mogao da ćutim', Politika Newspapers and Magazines (Serbian)
 UMESTO NEKROLOGA – ŽIVORAD KOVAČEVIĆ (1930–2011) 'Babe, žabe i lažni prijatelji', Vreme, 31. mart 2011 (Serbian)

1930 births
2011 deaths
Politicians from Jagodina
Ambassadors of Yugoslavia to the United States
Mayors of Belgrade
Serbian politicians who committed suicide
Suicides by firearm in Serbia
Burials at Belgrade New Cemetery